Hollowell is a village and civil parish in West Northamptonshire in England. At the time of the 2001 census, the parish's population, including the nearby hamlet of Teeton, was 353 people, increasing to 385 at the 2011 Census.   The village was originally a hamlet of Guilsborough, becoming a separate parish from 1850. Hollowell is mentioned in the Domesday Survey of 1086 as belonging the Bishop of Lincoln having "... 4 villeins with 1 bordar having 1 plough. It was, and is worth, 10 schillings. Bardi held (it) freely."

Geography

Landmarks
Hollowell Reservoir is a  reservoir between Northampton and Market Harborough and just north of the village. It has a sailing club and is also used for fishing.

Within the boundaries of the parochial parish stood the Northampton County Sanatorium (also known locally as Creaton Hospital), a tuberculosis hospital in operation between 1910 and 1979. In the 1980s it was converted to 13 private houses and is now called Highfield Park.

History and events
The villages name means 'hollow spring/stream'.

Being at the bottom of a valley, the village was vulnerable to icy and snow-filled roads before the use of council gritting. In the winter of 1947, Hollowell and Guilsborough were cut off from the main (Welford) road for several weeks. A Mr J Smith, who lived in Guilsborough, was recorded as delivering bread to the inhabitants on horseback during this time.

Hollowell Steam is a steam and heavy horse show held annually near the village on the first full weekend of July. The event was first held in 1986 to raise funds to repair the village's church roof.  It is now one of the largest steam rallies in the country, with 45 engines expected in 2007. Over £75,000 in funds were raised in 2004, distributed to local charities and groups. The event is run by Allen Eaton MBE.

References

External links

Official site of Hollowell Steam

Villages in Northamptonshire
Tourist attractions in Northamptonshire
Recreational fishing
West Northamptonshire District
Civil parishes in Northamptonshire